Gold Star Families Memorial and Park is located east of Soldier Field in Chicago, in the U.S. state of Illinois. The memorial is maintained by the Chicago Police Department Honor Guard and is intended to honor 585 CPD officers who died in the line of duty. The memorial was dedicated in 2006 by the Chicago Police Memorial Foundation.

See also
 List of public art in Chicago

References

External links
 
 Chicago Police Memorial Foundation

Monuments and memorials in Chicago
Outdoor sculptures in Chicago
Parks in Chicago
2006 establishments in Illinois